Andrew Douglas Morahan (born 11 August 1958) is a British commercial, film and music video director. He is the son of director Christopher Morahan and the half-brother of actress Hattie Morahan.
Married to Joanna Lewis, he has two children.

Videography

Television commercials
Aids – Denise, Jane, John, Josephine, Mike, Paul, Steven, Susan
Bacardi – Leaving
BBC – Demons
Carling – Clone, Football
Évian – Sugar Daddy
Gaymer's Olde English – Ivories
Greene King IPA – Busker
Guess Jeans – Cheat
Kilkenny – First Kiss
Miller GD – Traffic Jam
Physio Sport – Love Football
Tia Maria – Naked
Lurpak – Orgy

Films

Music videos

1980–1984

1985–1989

1990–1994

1995–1999

2000–2004

2005–present

References

External links
 
 

1958 births
Living people
Advertising directors
English music video directors
Film directors from London
People from Kensington
People from Mendip District